Mazerolles may refer to the following places in France:

Mazerolles, Charente, a commune in the department of Charente
Mazerolles, Charente-Maritime, a commune in the department of Charente-Maritime
Mazerolles, Landes, a commune in the department of Landes
Mazerolles, Pyrénées-Atlantiques, a commune in the department of Pyrénées-Atlantiques
Mazerolles, Hautes-Pyrénées, a commune in the department of Hautes-Pyrénées
Mazerolles, Vienne, a commune in the department of Vienne
Mazerolles-du-Razès, a commune in the department of Aude
Mazerolles-le-Salin, a commune in the department of Doubs